The 2018 Hawaii Bowl was a college football bowl game being played on December 22, 2018, in Honolulu, Hawaii. It was the 17th edition of the Hawaii Bowl, and one of the 2018–19 bowl games concluding the 2018 FBS football season. This was the first time since 2007 that the bowl was not played on Christmas Eve. Sponsored by the SoFi personal finance company, the game was officially called the SoFi Hawaii Bowl.

Teams
The game was played between the Hawaii Rainbow Warriors of the Mountain West Conference and the Louisiana Tech Bulldogs of Conference USA (C–USA). The teams had faced each other 10 times, with Hawaii holding an 8–2 lead in the series; both teams previously were members of the Western Athletic Conference.

This was Louisiana Tech's first trip to the Hawaii Bowl; it was Hawaii's eighth time in this bowl.

Hawaii Rainbow Warriors

Hawaii secured a spot in the bowl with a win on November 17 over the UNLV Rebels, ending a four-game losing streak and assuring the Rainbow Warriors of a bowl-eligible winning record, as they reached 7–5 with one game left to play. Hawaii subsequently defeated the San Diego State Aztecs, ending the regular season with an 8–5 overall record, 5–3 in conference. The Rainbow Warriors' participation in the Hawaii Bowl was confirmed by bowl organizers on November 28.

Louisiana Tech Bulldogs

Louisiana Tech announced their acceptance of a Hawaii Bowl bid on November 28. The Bulldogs compiled a 7–5 regular season record, 5–3 in conference.

Game summary

Scoring summary

Statistics

References

External links

Box score at ESPN

Hawaii Bowl
Hawaii Bowl
Hawaii Bowl
Hawaii Bowl
December 2018 sports events in Oceania
Hawaii Rainbow Warriors football bowl games
Louisiana Tech Bulldogs football bowl games